Borodianka is a former military air base in Ukraine located 3 km northwest of Borodianka in Kyiv Oblast. Since the end of the Cold War, all except a small area has been converted to agricultural use. Since 2019 Borodianka has been used as a sporting aerodrome, hosting parachute jumping, sky-diving and model aeroplane flying.

References

Soviet Air Force bases
Ukrainian airbases
Airports in Ukraine